Fort Zumwalt South High School (FZS) is in the Fort Zumwalt School District in Saint Peters, Missouri, United States.

In 1987, FZS was the second high school to be founded in the Fort Zumwalt District (after Fort Zumwalt North). Many extracurricular activities are offered, including basketball, soccer, swimming, volleyball, football, marching band, choir, National Honors Society, and other sport, academic, and arts activities. FZS participates in the A+ program.

Enrollment
The school opened in 1987 with a little over 400 students and dramatically increased to over 2,600 by 1998, making it one of the largest schools in the state. When West High was completed, the student population dropped to around 2,100. Enrollment increased to 2,300 students before subsiding to around 1,400 with completion of East High.

Sports and extracurricular activities
Fort Zumwalt South's winter guard placed 1st in their division in 2011 and again in 2013.

The Fort Zumwalt South Bulldogs won the Missouri State Championship in cross country in 2005 and 2006.

In 2009, Fort Zumwalt South won the class 4 Missouri State Championship in baseball.

In May 2012, the South High boys volleyball team won the Class 3 Missouri State Championship.

In February 2013 and February 2014, South High's science bowl team won the regional competition allowing them to represent Missouri at the National Science Bowl competition in Washington D.C.

In 2018 and 2020, the boys varsity soccer team won the Class 3 Missouri State Championship. In 2021, the varsity girls soccer team won the class 3 Missouri State Championship. With this title, Fort Zumwalt South became the first Missouri public school to win state championships in boys and girls soccer in the same school year.

Notable alumni
 Steve Colyer, baseball player
 Tom Layne, baseball player

References

External links
 Fort Zumwalt South official website

High schools in St. Charles County, Missouri
Educational institutions established in 1987
Public high schools in Missouri
1987 establishments in Missouri
St. Peters, Missouri